Lake Alpine is an unincorporated community in Alpine County, California. It is located on the north shore of Lake Alpine, at an elevation of 7388 feet (2252 m).

A post office operated at Lake Alpine from 1927 to 1972.

Camping
Camping is available near the lake. Also there are a number of beaches.

References

External links

Unincorporated communities in Alpine County, California
Populated places in the Sierra Nevada (United States)
Unincorporated communities in California